The Yancy Street Gang is a fictional street gang appearing in American comic books published by Marvel Comics. It is occasionally featured in the Fantastic Four comic book. The gang is often seen as an antagonist for the Thing, showering him with insults, and occasionally heads of lettuce. In their early appearances, they were an "off-screen" presence, with only their hands and arms visible on-panel.

Origins of the concept
Created by Stan Lee and Jack Kirby in the early days of the Fantastic Four comic, "Yancy Street" is a reference to the Lower East Side of Manhattan, where Kirby grew up. This was the Thing's old's neighborhood as well, and the character was targeted by the Yancy Street Gang for being a "sellout", and abandoning his working-class, hoodlum roots. Kirby considered the Thing to be his "alter ego", and the character's troubled relationship with his old neighborhood has been seen as a metaphor for Kirby's own Jewish identity. A 2002 story brought the Thing back to his old neighborhood, to return a Star of David that he stole from a pawn shop as initiation into the gang; this story was the first to reveal that the character is Jewish.

Publication history
The Yancy Street Gang was created by Stan Lee and Jack Kirby, and first appeared in Fantastic Four #15 (June 1963), though mostly off-panel; as in most of their appearances, only their arms are visible as they throw objects at the Thing and yell insults. The Dead End Kids-type gang was first mentioned, although not seen, in Fantastic Four #6. Yancy Street is named in reference to the real Delancey Street, which extends from the Bowery in Manhattan's Lower East Side eastward to the Williamsburg Bridge. However, Yancy Street is seen in Fantastic Four #15 (June 1963) to intersect with 10th Avenue, which is on the west side of Manhattan.

Fictional group history
The Yancy Street Gang is depicted as frequenting downtown Manhattan, and serves as a recurring antagonist of the Thing, tormenting him for typically humorous effect. It was originally depicted as composed only of youths, but later depictions have both young members as well as adult members from an earlier generation, who have passed their grudge against the Thing to the younger members. Although described as a gang, the Yancy Street Gang are rarely depicted as engaging in criminal activities (except in their harassment of the Thing, who rarely takes their actions seriously) and may be more accurately described as a circle of admittedly roughneck friends and associates who encourage neighborhood youths to divert their energies into harmlessly heckling the virtually indestructible Thing, rather than into more dangerous and illegal pursuits.

The adult members of the Yancy Street Gang, all apparently blue-collar workers (many of them typically wear hardhats) who still live in the neighborhood, are often seen tormenting the Thing in some way, usually by throwing things at him and shouting abuse whenever he entered Yancy Street. They were also thought to send him booby-trapped parcels, although a retcon in Fantastic Four vol. 3 #61, written by Mark Waid, revealed that these packages (or at least many of them) had actually been sent by the Human Torch as part of his own recurring campaign of pranks against the Thing. As a youth, Ben Grimm formerly led the gang, and the other members, who have retained their loyalty to it in adulthood, seemingly resent him for having "sold out" by leaving the neighborhood and pursuing a higher education and standard of living, culminating in his position as one of the Air Force's most accomplished pilots and, later, as a world-famous adventurer. However, they are generally portrayed as good-natured at heart and have occasionally helped the Fantastic Four if a supervillain threatens their neighborhood itself or if they think that a villain is giving the Thing too much trouble (noting on such occasions that "That's our job!"). They sometimes seem to genuinely like the Thing, if only because he makes such an effective and (sometimes) good-humored target for their pranks; they were quite remorseful when he seemingly died in action, only to quickly retract the sentiment when he proved to have survived.

Other heroes have become involved with the local life, such as when Spider-Man cleared out a Negative Zone invasion from Yancy Street and saved three residents from being lost forever.

Making peace
In The Thing #6 (2006 series), the Thing's relationship with Yancy Street was finally reconciled, after the millionaire (following events in the ongoing Fantastic Four comic) Thing donates a state-of-the-art recreational facility to the neighborhood. Initially resentful because they regarded the project as an exercise in ego, they later learned that it was named in honor of the Thing's deceased brother Daniel Grimm Jr. (another Yancy Street Gang alumnus) and they declared the facility to be under their informal protection. The facility is later seen again when Benjamin is encouraging the local youth to make use of the location, and to hit the bags instead of each other.

The adult Yancy Street Gang members are traditionally shown in the comics with their faces obscured by the shadows of their hardhats or other headwear. The younger "next generation" Yancy Streeters, however, have been fully seen, including in one story (Fantastic Four #361 "Miracle On Yancy Street!" by Paul Ryan & Tom DeFalco) which portrays the Gang with gimmicks and codenames similar to Kirby's DC Comics kid gangs.

Civil War
The Yancy Street Gang has become deeply involved during the Civil War storyline. They are part of a large group of New York citizens protesting the arresting of superheroes who do not wish to register with the United States Government. Ben Grimm becomes involved with the dispute, being asked by police forces to talk with the Gang regulars. Ben meets with Cee, a young man in a leadership position. Both Cee and the police wish for Ben to take a more active role, but he maintains his neutrality. While negotiations are going on, another gang member, Mouse, has become involved with longtime FF villains the Puppet Master and the Mad Thinker. The two men put in motion a plan that brings a superhero prisoner convoy down Yancy Street itself. Though Spider-Man recognizes the potential trouble as the convoy turns in, it is far too late.

Military forces and superheroes on both sides of the Registration Act, some affected by the villains and some fighting with their own agendas, engage in a property-damaging fight. Mouse, not in control of his own mind, drops a bomb into the middle of the fight. In an effort to save lives, Ben Grimm smashes a large, empty truck onto the bomb. This effort fails, as the explosion kills Cee. Ben furiously hands Cee's body to the other gang members and shames the people involved into quitting the fighting.

A later version of the Yancy Street Gang was composed of blue-collar criminals who were former dot-com start-ups, ex-Wall Street traders, and failed hedge fund managers. This version of the Yancy Street Gang encountered Ben Grimm and the Human Torch during a period where the Thing briefly reverted to his human form. Despite his lack of physical strength, Ben was still able to send the Gang packing.

Yancy Street was featured when a mysterious figure stealing Christmas decorations led Ben Grimm to the Yancy Street Children's Home. This interrupted Ben Grimm's plan to go a Jewish superhero dinner, but turned out well for the children, who were lacking their own dinner. The heroes shared with the children.

Fear Itself
During the "Fear Itself" storyline, the physical Yancy Street itself is obliterated by the Thing, who was transformed into Angrir: Breaker of Souls.

Personal relations with heroes
The Yancy Street Gang members Petey, Tony, and an unnamed member later played poker with the Thing and Gambit.

At the time when the Fantastic Four were in space, the Yancy Street Gang took offense to Darla Deering acting as Ms. Thing where they took offense to her "posing" as the Thing. They sent one of their typical booby-trapped parcels to her hotel room after a musical performance. Darla and her teammate Ant-Man were covered in whipped cream and sparkles, while Yancy Street Gang members (who were wearing Thing masks) snapped photos of the pair before fleeing off into Times Square. They were able to get away, thanks to the New Year's Eve celebrations going on at the time, and they managed to post the embarrassing photos online. The Yancy Street Gang then became more tech-savvy by including hackers Carlos Hernandez, Douglas Ray, and Jason Carter, where they hacked into the contest so that the Yancy Street Gang can be in attendance to Darla Deering's private acoustic performance. During Darla's performance, they pelted her with fruit and vegetables, forcing her to flee. However, Ant-Man stowed away on their bodies, learned the passwords to all their social media accounts and emailed all the information to their rivals in order to force them to stop harassing Darla Deering. Following this incident, the hackers of the Yancy Street Gang agreed to help hack into Doctor Doom's computer database where they foiled his plans to destroy the Future Foundation alongside Annihilus and Kid Immortus.

The physical Yancy Street is later seen in an improved rebuilt condition when its subway system is invaded by slightly violent Killer Folk from the past. The gang was then fended off by the Killer Folk, who took over the street itself. The Killer Folk were later fended off by Moon Girl and Devil Dinosaur. Yancy Street is later the location of an incursion by Omnipotents, a force that eats universes.

The Fantastic Four's move to Yancy Street, plus the intentional influence of super villains, caused the rents to spike. The safety of literally being near the Fantastic Four causes the street to become a more desirable neighborhood. Several members of the Yancy Street Gang are seen when they assist Ben Grimm in fighting the 'Terrible Trio'. This group was threatening the safety and lives of several innocent Yancy Street residents. Ultimately Reed Richards fixes the housing situation with a device that doubles the amount of apartments without altering the size of the actual apartment building.

Members

Current 
 "Dictionary" Dawson - The eloquent member of the Yancy Street Gang.
 "Lugwrench" Lubowski - 
 "Rhythm" Ruiz - 
 Carlos Hernandez - The Yancy Street Gang's hacker.
 Douglas Ray - The Yancy Street Gang's hacker.
 Jack - 
 Jason Carter - The Yancy Street Gang's hacker.
 Larry "Little" Lee - 
 Manny "Smooth" Merengues - 
 Petey - 
 Stan - 
 Tommie "Two-Fisted" Boyd - 
 Tony -

Former members
 Cee - Member of the Yancy Street Gang. Killed in the crossfire between the Pro-Registration forces and the Anti-Registration forces.
 Daniel Grimm Jr. - The older brother of the Thing, who was heavily involved with the Yancy Street Gang. Killed during a gang war between the Thompson Avenue Gang.

Other versions

Fantastic Four: The End
In the alternate future of Fantastic Four: The End, Ben Grimm has named his daughter Yancy, possibly in honor of the gang.

Spider-Gwen
In the pages of Spider-Gwen which take place on Earth-65, the Yancy Street Gang consists of Hobie Brown, Izzy, and some unnamed members. The Yancy Street Gang rooted for Spider-Woman, and were graffiti-spraying a billboard attacking Spider-Woman when Officer Ben Grimm tried to catch them. However, they witnessed Grimm being attacked and abducted by the Vulture.

Startling Stories
In this alternate universe, the Yancy Street Gang try to help Ben stop a murderous gang of super-powered thugs that have holed up on Yancy Street. It goes poorly, with many dead and about half the street obliterated in a gas truck explosion.

In other media

Television
 The Yancy Street Gang appear in the 1967 Fantastic Four cartoon.
 The Yancy Street Gang appear in the unique 1979 Hanna-Barbera Saturday morning cartoon Fred and Barney Meet the Thing. This version is reimagined as a trio of bikers who were recurring, if fairly harmless, antagonists. The trio is made up of Spike (voiced by Art Metrano), Stretch (voiced by Wayne Morton), and Turkey (voiced by Michael Sheehan). The Yancy Street Gang appear in some episodes to play practical jokes on the Thing and causing havoc which usually results in them getting thwarted by the Thing.
 The Yancy Street Gang did not appear in the 1994 Fantastic Four cartoon itself, but they appeared in the 1996 Incredible Hulk episode "Fantastic Fortitude" where the Yancy Street Gang (who were always off-camera, but their shadows were visible) pull a prank on the Thing by going a fake gorilla habitat opening that the Thing fell for. After the Thing was defeated by the Ogress, the Yancy Street Gang later distributes leaflets marked "THING WHUPPED BY A WOMAN!!" from a passing airplane, much to the Thing's chagrin.
 The Yancy Street Gang was mentioned in The Super Hero Squad Show episode "If This Be My Thanos!". They are mentioned when the Thing was arguing with the Hulk on who is the strongest whilst battling with the Skrulls in space.
 Yancy Street was mentioned in The Avengers: Earth's Mightiest Heroes.
 The Yancy Street Gang were mentioned in an episode of Iron Man: Armored Adventures by Nick Fury.
 In the Avengers Assemble episode "Hulk's Day Out", Captain America, the Falcon, Hawkeye, and the Hulk visit Yancy Street. The episode reveals that the Hulk and the Thing compete against one another at Yancy Street's bowling alley every week.

Video games
 The Yancy Street Gang appear in the Ultimate Spider-Man video game. They appear as a common street thug gang, where they all get beaten up by Spider-Man. None of the gang's members get actually named nor is a reference to the Thing made (except when one thug says "It's robberin' time", a play on the Thing's catchphrase "It's clobberin' time!").
 The Yancy Street Gang appear in the Fantastic Four video game (based on the movie). This version is a gang of vicious-looking bikers who capture Alicia Masters in the Thing's solo segment detailing his encounter with the Yancy Street Gang.
 In the Marvel Puzzle Quest video game, "Yancy Street Special" is a special move utilized by "The Thing (Classic)".

Miscellaneous
 At Universal Studios Islands of Adventure in Orlando, Yancy Street can be seen in the Marvel Super Hero Island section.

References

External links
 Yancy Street Gang at Marvel Wiki

Fantastic Four
Characters created by Jack Kirby
Characters created by Stan Lee
Fictional characters from Manhattan
Fictional gangs
Marvel Comics characters